Lars Fredrik Jansson (8 October 1926, Helsinki – 31 July 2000, Helsinki) was a Finnish author and cartoonist.

Early life 
A native of Helsinki, Jansson was the son of a sculptor, Viktor Jansson, and a Swedish-born illustrator, Signe Hammarsten-Jansson. His siblings included an older sister, writer Tove Jansson, and an older brother, photographer Per Olov Jansson. In 1957, he began working with his sister on the writing of the Moomin comic strip, which he produced single-handedly from 1960 to 1975. Between 1990 and 1992, Jansson worked with Dennis Livson to develop the concept of the Moomin animated series in Japan. His daughter, Sophia, worked together with him in 1993 to help manage the production of a new series of Moomin strips which Sophia now manages solely.

References

External links

Lars Jansson profile at Lambiek.net

1926 births
2000 deaths
Artists from Helsinki
Finnish comic strip cartoonists
Swedish-speaking Finns
Finnish comics artists
Finnish comics writers
Moomins
Lars
Finnish people of Swedish descent